Domingo Antonio Cedeño Donastorg (born November 4, 1968) is a Dominican former professional baseball infielder, who played in Major League Baseball (MLB) in parts of seven seasons from  to  for the Toronto Blue Jays, Chicago White Sox, Texas Rangers, Seattle Mariners, and Philadelphia Phillies.

References

External links

1968 births
Living people
Cafeteros de Córdoba players
Chicago White Sox players
Dominican Republic expatriate baseball players in Canada
Dominican Republic expatriate baseball players in Mexico
Dominican Republic expatriate baseball players in the United States
Dunedin Blue Jays players
Knoxville Blue Jays players

Major League Baseball infielders
Major League Baseball players from the Dominican Republic
Medicine Hat Blue Jays players
Mexican League baseball second basemen
Mexican League baseball shortstops
Myrtle Beach Blue Jays players
Norfolk Tides players
Oklahoma City 89ers players
People from La Romana, Dominican Republic
Philadelphia Phillies players
Seattle Mariners players
Syracuse Chiefs players
Tacoma Rainiers players
Texas Rangers players
Toronto Blue Jays players
Toros del Este players
Tulsa Drillers players